Aviara is an Isoko town in Delta State, southern Nigeria.

Populated places in Delta State